Chu Van An High School (Vietnamese: Trường Trung học phổ thông Quốc gia Chu Văn An), also known as Chu Van An National School or Pomelo School (trường Bưởi, before 1945) one of the three national high schools for the gifted in Vietnam along with Quoc Hoc High School in Huế and Le Hong Phong High School in Ho Chi Minh City. It is also one of the three magnet high schools in Hanoi, Vietnam, along with Hanoi-Amsterdam High School and Nguyen Hue High School. Established by the French authorities in 1908 as High School of the Protectorate (French: Lycée du Protectorat), Chu Van An is one of the oldest institutions for secondary education in South East Asia. Despite the initial intention to train native civil servants to serve the French colonial establishments, Vietnamese students at Bưởi school had many times struggled against colonial doctrine. A lot of Bưởi alumni became renowned political leaders and cultural figures in many areas of Vietnamese society such as Nguyễn Văn Cừ - the fourth general secretary of Communist Party of Vietnam, Phạm Văn Đồng - the first prime minister of North Vietnam and united Vietnam, Nguyễn Cao Kỳ- former vice president and prime minister of South Vietnam, Kaysone Phomvihane-  former leader of the Lao People's Revolutionary Party, Prince Souphanouvong- the first president of Laos.

In 1945, Lycée du Protectorat was renamed to Chu Van An High School.

History 

On 12 December 1908, the Governor-General of Indochina Antony Wladislas Klobukowski made the decision to establish Collège du Protectorat (College of the Protectorate, similar to the secondary school) based on the merger of the Thông ngôn Bờ sông school, the Jules Ferry Nam Dinh secondary school and the pedagogy class (Cours normal) on Pottier street. In 1931, the school was upgraded to a lycée (similar to the high school) - Lycée du Protectorat (The school of Protectorate). Since the school was built on the land of Thuy Khuê village, Kẻ Bưởi, people often called it Bưởi School.

By 1943, the school had to move to the Phúc Nhạc monastery in Ninh Bình.In 1945, they returned to Hà Nội. After Japan overthrew France, on 12 June 1945, the northern king's special envoy Phan Kế Toại decided to change the school's name to Chu Van An - named after the most well-respected teacher in Vietnamese history Chu Văn An , and appointed professor Nguyễn Gia Tường to the principal position. Tường was the first Vietnamese principal of the Bưởi - Chu Văn An High School.

Admission
As one of the three high schools for gifted students in Hanoi (together with Hanoi - Amsterdam High School and Nguyen Hue Specialized High School), Chu Van An High School is highly selective in its admission process. Every year, the school receives over 3000 applications, out of which only 500 to 600 would be admitted. Applicants are required to take an entrance exam conducted by Hanoi Department of Education and Training. This examination usually takes place around mid-June with three subjects - Mathematics, Literature and English, and one additional subject for students who want to be admitted in specialized classes.

Principal 
Dinh Si Dai 1997-2008
Chu Xuan Dung 2008 - 2015
Le Mai Anh 2015 - present.

Notable alumni and teachers 
Teachers
Hoàng Xuân Hãn, Minister - Ministry of Education under the regime of Trần Trọng Kim
Nguyễn Văn Huyên, Minister - Ministry of Education, North Vietnam for 29 years
Võ Nguyên Giáp, Minister - Minister of Defence (Vietnam) & Deputy Prime Minister of Vietnam
Tô Ngọc Vân

Alumni
Politics and military
Lê Hồng Phong, the second general secretary of the Communist Party of Vietnam 
Nguyễn Văn Cừ, the fourth general secretary of the Communist Party of Vietnam 
Phạm Văn Đồng, the first prime minister of North Vietnam and united Vietnam
Trịnh Đình Cửu, general secretary of the former Communist Party of Vietnam
Nguyễn Cao Kỳ, former vice president and prime minister of South Vietnam
Ngô Gia Tự, (Class of 1922), general secretary of Communist Party of Vietnam in South Vietnam
Dương Đức Hiền, the first general secretary of Democratic Party of Vietnam
Kaysone Phomvihane, former leader of the Lao People's Revolutionary Party
Prince Souphanouvong, the first president of Laos
Lê Trọng Tấn, Army General and Chief of General Staff of Vietnamese Army
Nguyễn Tường Tam (Nhất Linh), Novelist, Minister - Ministry of Foreign Affairs
Nguyễn Cơ Thạch, Minister- Ministry of Foreign Affairs
Nguyễn Chí Dũng, Minister- Ministry of Planning & Investment (Vietnam)
Phan Anh, Lawyer, Minister - Ministry of Defence
Vương Văn Bắc, Minister - Ministry of Foreign Affairs, South Vietnam
Nguyễn Khoa Điềm, Minister - Ministry of Culture, Sports and Tourism 
Nguyễn Phương Nga, Deputy Minister - Ministry of Foreign Affairs
Đặng Vũ Hiệp (Class of 1941), Deputy Minister - Ministry of Defence 

Science & Education
Tôn Thất Tùng, Anatomist, Deputy Minister - Ministry of Health, Director of Vietnam – Germany Hospital or Bệnh viện Việt Đức
Tạ Quang Bửu (Class of 1926), Mathematician, Minister - Ministry of Education
Lê Văn Thiêm (Class of 1936), Mathematician, Director - Institute of Mathematical Science
Nguỵ Như Kon Tum, Physician, First Principal of Vietnam National University
Van H. Vu – Mathematician
Nguyễn Văn Chiển (Class of 1934), geologist, author of (Atlas) Vietnam.
Nguyễn Đình Ngọc, Secret Intelligence Officer, Vice President -The Radio and Electronics Association of Vietnam (EAV)
Dương Trung Quốc, Historian, General Secretary - Historical Science Association of Vietnam, Congressman 
Trần Đức Thảo, Philosopher
Lê Văn Lan, Historian, Founder and President of Institute of Historical Studies
Nguyễn Khắc Viện (Class of 1932)

Culture
Nguyễn Đình Thi (Class of 1941), Poet, General Secretary - Vietnam Writers' Association
Ngô Xuân Diệu, Poet
Bùi Văn Bảo (Class of 1940), Poet
Hồ Trọng Hiếu (Tú Mỡ) (Class of 1915), Poet
Nguyễn Công Hoan (Class of 1920), Novelist.
Nam Trân (Class of 1924), Poet
Vũ Khắc Khoan, Novelist
Nguyễn Hiến Lê (Class of 1926)
Dương Bích Liên, Painter - Member of the Sáng - Nghiêm - Liên - Phái 
Tô Ngọc Vân, Painter - Member of the Trí – Vân – Lân – Cẩn 
Vũ Đình Liên (Class of 1930), Poet
Vương Trí Nhàn (Class of 1958), Literary Critics
Võ An Ninh, Photographer
Hoàng Ngọc Phách (Class of 1914), Novelist
Nguyễn Tường Tam (Nhất Linh), Novelist, Minister - Ministry of Foreign Affairs
Trần Tiến, Actor, People's Artist Award
Thanh Tùng, Musician

References

External links

 - Chu Van An High School official website

High schools in Hanoi
High schools in Vietnam
Provincial public magnet high schools in Vietnam
High schools for the gifted in Vietnam
Schools in Hanoi
Educational institutions established in 1908
1908 establishments in Vietnam